HBO Latin America has distributed a number of original programs, including original series, specials, miniseries, documentaries and films. 

The first self-commissioned original content series was Epitafios, released in 2004, and the company has grown its original content in the region since that time. All programming is organized by its primary genre or format, country of production and is sorted by premiere date.

Original programming

Drama

Comedy

Docu-series

Variety and talk shows

References

 
Latin America
Latin America
HBO Latin America